St. Vincent College (CDP) is a census-designated place located in Unity Township, Westmoreland County in the state of Pennsylvania, United States.  The community is centered on Saint Vincent College located to the south of Latrobe near U.S. Route 30.  As of the 2010 census the population was 1,357 residents.

References

Census-designated places in Westmoreland County, Pennsylvania
Census-designated places in Pennsylvania